The 1994–95 Biathlon World Cup was a multi-race tournament over a season of biathlon, organised by the International Biathlon Union. The season started on 8 December 1994 in Bad Gastein, Austria, and ended on 19 March 1995 in Lillehammer, Norway. It was the 18th season of the Biathlon World Cup.

Calendar
Below is the IBU World Cup calendar for the 1994–95 season.

World Cup Podium

Men

Women

Men's team

Women's team

Standings: Men

Overall 

Final standings after 14 races.

Individual 

Final standings after 7 races.

Sprint 

Final standings after 7 races.

Nation 

Final standings after 20 races.

Standings: Women

Overall 

Final standings after 14 races.

Individual 

Final standings after 7 races.

Sprint 

Final standings after 7 races.

Nation 

Final standings after 20 races.

Medal table

Achievements
Victory in this World Cup (all-time number of victories in parentheses)

Men
 , 2 (7) first places
 , 2 (2) first places
 , 1 (4) first place
 , 1 (2) first place
 , 1 (2) first place
 , 1 (2) first place
 , 1 (2) first place
 , 1 (2) first place
 , 1 (1) first place
 , 1 (1) first place
 , 1 (1) first place
 , 1 (1) first place

Women
 , 3 (7) first places
 , 3 (6) first places
 , 1 (4) first place
 , 1 (2) first place
 , 1 (1) first place
 , 1 (1) first place
 , 1 (1) first place
 , 1 (1) first place
 , 1 (1) first place
 , 1 (1) first place

Retirements
Following notable biathletes retired after the 1994–95 season:

External links
IBU official site

References

Biathlon World Cup
1994 in biathlon
1995 in biathlon